"Lovumba" is the second official single by Puerto Rican reggaeton singer Daddy Yankee from his sixth studio album, Prestige (2012). The single was released digitally on October 4, 2011. The song is a fusion of mambo, soca and dance beats. The name "Lovumba" is a blend of the words Love and Rumba. The song was produced by Musicologo and Menes (Los de La Nazza). A Remix version that featured Daddy Yankee and Don Omar was released on January 7, 2012. Both the single and remix versions are included on Daddy Yankee's album Prestige. The song was nominated for the Latin Grammy Award for Best Urban Song.

Track listing
iTunes digital download
"Lovumba (Prestige)" — 3:38
"Lovumba (Remix)" (featuring Don Omar) - 3:32
"Lovumba (Club Remix)" - 3:50

Music video
The music video for Lovumba was recorded in Puerto Rico in December 2011 and was directed by Carlos "Bambam" Martin. The video was released on January 11, 2012.

Charts

Weekly charts

Year-end charts

Certification

See also
List of Billboard number-one Latin songs of 2012

References

Daddy Yankee songs
2011 songs
Songs written by Daddy Yankee